DC Web Women (DCWW) is a nonprofit professional organization for women in technology and new media based in the Washington, D.C., area. Established in 1999, the organization's vision is "to educate, inspire and encourage girls and women in the field of technology." The organization hosts an email discussion list, and sponsors monthly workshops and networking events.

History 
DC Web Women began in 1999 as a chapter of Webgrrls. The group was started in a coffee shop by Debbie Weil and Catherine Buzzel. This initial meeting between the two women led to a second meeting in a women owned internet café in the Washington DC area with three additional like-minded women: Cathy Ganssle, Shellie Holubek, and Miriam Jaffe. This meeting led to the foundation of the organization DC Web Women.

On February 15, 1999, the organization registered as a non-profit and was renamed to "DC Web Women."

References

External links
DC Web Women Web site

See also
 San Francisco Women on the Web
 Her Domain
 Webgrrls

Professional associations based in the United States
Organizations for women in science and technology
Women's occupational organizations
Organizations established in 1999
Organizations based in Washington, D.C.
Professional associations for women
1999 establishments in Washington, D.C.
Women in Washington, D.C.